Berol is a former British stationery manufacturing company, based in Lichfield. The company, established in 1845, manufactured a wide range of products including writing implements and art materials. In 1995 it was acquired by Sanford L.P., a division of Newell Brands, becoming a subsidiary of it until the last factory closed in 2010. Since then, Berol survived as a brand of imported products.

Berol's product lines included art materials such as acrylics, pastels, oil pastels, inks, crayons, adhesives, and other mediums; while the writing instruments line composed of pencils, colored pencils, pens, and markers, plus accessories.

History 
The "Eagle Pencil Company" was founded by Franconian immigrant Daniel Berolzheimer in 1856 opening a pencil shop in New York City and a factory in Yonkers. In 1894 the company extended its business opening office, warehouse and showrooms in London.

Eagle Pencil also opened a factory in Tottenham, that started operating towards the end of 1907. The outbreak of the World War II in 1939 saw the factory pause pencil manufacture and instead produce secret military equipment. Pencil manufacture recommenced in 1946.

A series of post-war corporate acquisitions meant that the Eagle Pencil name was no longer appropriate. In 1969 the company name was changed to "Berol", the owning family's now-shortened surname. Berol's head office remained at the Tottenham factory until the need for extra production space led to a move to Whetstone, London. 
 
In June 1967 the company opened a purpose built factory on the Hardwick Industrial Estate in King's Lynn, Norfolk. The company's head office moved from Whetstone to King's Lynn in 1978.

In 1986, Chairman Kenneth Berol, announced the family's intention to sell the company as there was no sixth generation family successor. In 1987, Berol was acquired by the Empire Pencil Corporation of Tennessee.

In February 1992 the company decided to close the Tottenham factory and moved some production to King's Lynn. 1995 saw the Newell Company acquire the Berol Corporation with Berol being placed in its Sanford division.

2003 saw the King's Lynn factory close with 230 redundancies. Some production was transferred to the former Parker Pen factory in Newhaven, Sussex, but the factory was closed in 2010. From then on, all products under the name "Berol" were imported goods.

Products 
Product lines manufactured by Berol were:

References

External links

 Official website (archived, 30 Dec 2016)
 Eagle Pencils vintage models
 "That Common Pencil & The Eagle Pencil Company", by Sterling Picard

Newell Brands
Companies established in 1856
Companies disestablished in 2010
Art materials brands
Writing implement manufacturers
British brands